"Dressing down" or "dressing-down" is an English-language idiom that may refer to:
 An especially severe, highly formalized, and often public form of military discipline incident to reduction in rank or, in extreme cases, complete dismissal via the ceremony of degradation (also termed "cashiering," especially when performed upon an officer):  To amplify the already-severe punishment inherent in a reduction in rank, the authorities imposing it may confirm it in a ceremony whose form is analogous to that of a promotion ceremony in that its participants remove the uniform's existing rank insignia and replace that insignia with the insignia of the soldier's new, lesser/lower rank; the degradation/cashiering ceremony has traditionally involved stripping both rank insignia and all other military insignia from the uniform.
 By metonymy from the associated ceremony, the reduction in rank itself.
 Any act of severely reprimanding or scolding someone.
 The wearing of clothes socially regarded as being appropriate for only events less formal than the occasion at which one is wearing them (contrast antonym "dress[ing] up" from which this usage of the idiom is derived by alteration)
 "Dress-down day" (more commonly "casual day"), a workday during which the managers of a business formally relax its dress code for the day, usually to a specified degree and pursuant to an announcement made far enough in advance that employees can plan accordingly
When managers schedule such relaxations at regular intervals as part of the dress code itself, rather than an authorized departure from it, workdays featuring them are widely known as "dress-down [X]" or "casual [X]," where X is the recurring occasion (e.g., a given weekday, as in "casual Friday") with which the relaxation is associated.

See also

Military
 Reduction in rank
 Military degradation

Social/corporate
 Casual day
Casual Friday(s)

In literature and popular culture
 Rudyard Kipling's poem Danny Deever, whose title figure is subjected to the British version of the military degradation ceremony before being executed for the homicide of a fellow soldier

References 

English-language idioms